The Ultimate Fighting Championship (UFC) is a mixed martial arts (MMA) promotion, founded in 1993 by Art Davie and Rorion Gracie. The organization was purchased from its parent company SEG in 2001 by Zuffa LLC, a promotional company owned by Las Vegas casino magnates, Lorenzo and Frank Fertitta and managed by Dana White (current president of operations). Since its inception, and through its current Zuffa management, the UFC has remained one of the more dominant MMA promotions in the world, playing host to a wide field of MMA fighters.

This list provides an up-to-date roster of all Irish fighters currently competing or have previously competed under the UFC promotional banner. Fighters are organized by weight class and within their weight class by their number of appearances inside the UFC. Fighters with the same number of fights are listed in order of their number of wins. Fighters with the same UFC record are listed alphabetically.

World Extreme Cagefighting (WEC) was purchased by Zuffa in 2006 and officially merged under the UFC brand on January 1, 2011. All former WEC fighters have had their WEC record listed in place of their UFC record, starting with WEC 25 (the first WEC event under Zuffa). These records have been, and will be, continued as former WEC fighters move on in the UFC.

Strikeforce was purchased by Zuffa in 2011 and officially merged under the UFC brand on January 12, 2013. All former Strikeforce fighters have had their Strikeforce record listed in place of their UFC record, starting with Strikeforce Challengers: Wilcox vs. Damm (the first Strikeforce event under Zuffa). These records have been, and will be, continued as former Strikeforce fighters move on in the UFC.

Each fight record has four categories: wins, losses, draws, and no-contests (NC). All fight records in this article are displayed in that order, with fights resulting in a no-contest listed in parentheses.

Welterweights (170 lb, 77 kg)

Bold indicated fighter is still active on the UFC roster.
Italic indicates fighter is retired / no longer competes in MMA

Lightweights (155 lb, 70 kg)

Featherweights (145 lb, 65 kg)

Flyweights (125 lb, 56 kg)

Women's strawweights (115 lb, 52 kg)

See also

List of UFC champions
List of current Bellator fighters
List of current WSOF fighters
List of current Invicta FC fighters

Notes

References

Irish
Lists of mixed martial artists
UFC fighters